Cannock and Burntwood was a parliamentary constituency in Staffordshire which returned one Member of Parliament (MP)  to the House of Commons of the Parliament of the United Kingdom.

History
The constituency was created at the 1983 general election. Its territory was taken from two abolished constituencies: 68.3% from Cannock, and 31.97% from Lichfield and Tamworth. It disappeared at the 1997 general election, when it was split between two new seats: 68.49% of its territory went to Cannock Chase, and 31.51% to Lichfield.

Boundaries 
The District of Cannock Chase wards of Anglesey, Broomhill, Cannock South, Chadsmoor, Heath Hayes, Longford, Norton Canes, Parkside, Pye Green Valley, and Rawnsley, and the District of Lichfield wards of All Saints, Boney Hay, Chase Terrace, Chasetown, Hammerwich, Highfield, Redslade, and Summerfield.

Members of Parliament

Elections

Elections in the 1980s

Elections in the 1990s

See also 
List of parliamentary constituencies in Staffordshire

Notes and references 

Parliamentary constituencies in Staffordshire (historic)
Constituencies of the Parliament of the United Kingdom established in 1983
Constituencies of the Parliament of the United Kingdom disestablished in 1997
Cannock Chase